ZNS-2 (branded as Inspiration 107.9) is the second-oldest radio station in the Bahamas, having begun broadcasting in 1962 on the AM band at 1240 kHz with a power of 1 kW.  At some unknown point in the 1990s, the station migrated to the FM band on 107.9 MHz. It is under ownership of the Broadcasting Corporation of The Bahamas.

External links
 Broadcasting Corporation of The Bahamas
 FCC information for ZNS-2
 Official ZNS 

Christian radio stations in North America
Radio stations in the Bahamas
Radio stations established in 1962
Shortwave radio stations